Wild Stallion is a 1952 American Western film directed by Lewis D. Collins and starring Ben Johnson, Edgar Buchanan and Martha Hyer. The film's sets were designed by the art director Martin Obzina.

Cast
Ben Johnson as Dan Light
Edgar Buchanan as John Wintergreen
Martha Hyer as Caroline Cullen
Hayden Rorke as Maj. Cullen
Hugh Beaumont as Capt. Wilmurt
Orley Lindgren as Young Dan Light
Don Haggerty as Sgt. Keach
Susan Odin as Caroline - as a child
I. Stanford Jolley as Bill Cole
Barbara Wooddell as Abigail Light
John Halloran as John Light
Don Garner as Cpl. Thompson
John Hart as cavalry corporal
Perc Launders as army doctor
William Newell as Sergeant
Bob Peoples as cavalryman
Stanley Price as cavalry sentry
Lee Roberts as Cavalry Corporal
Elizabeth Russell as Dan's school teacher

References

External links

1952 Western (genre) films
American Western (genre) films
Films directed by Lewis D. Collins
Films produced by Walter Mirisch
Monogram Pictures films
American black-and-white films
1950s English-language films
1950s American films